Natalie Norwick (May 28, 1923December 20, 2007) was an American actor who performed on stage and in television and films over a span of 54 years.

Early life
She was born Natalie Theodora Katz to Russian immigrants Isidore Katz, a theatre musician, and Lillian Waxberg Katz. Her only sibling was her twin sister Gloria Katz. She grew up in the Bronx, speaking both Russian, her first language, and English. By 1940, she had completed high school, and the following year took out a social security card in her birth name.

Early stage career
During October 1945, Natalie Norwick, now using her stage name, appeared as Eliza in a touring company's musical version of Uncle Tom's Cabin. She next appeared in The Servant of Two Masters, an Equity Library Theatre-sponsored production performed at the Harlem Library auditorium in April 1946. That July she appeared in a summer stock adaptation of Pride and Prejudice, in which she played Jane Bennet.

Following its successful Broadway run in 1946, the national touring company for Lute Song had Natalie cast as the Page while also understudying first Mary Martin and then Dolly Haas, as the female lead. In the latter role, Yul Brynner, the male lead, helped Natalie make the adjustment from character to leading performer, for which she later credited him and her main drama coach Uta Hagen.

Kaufman and Gordon directed and produced a comedy called Town House, for which a traditional two-week tryout in Boston was cast in August 1948. Natalie Norwick won a feature role as Madamoiselle, and performed throughout the tryout, but the part was one of several cut for the Broadway run. It didn't help, as the play lasted only twelve performances at the National Theatre.

The following June 1949, Natalie Norwick did a season of summer stock at the Cobleigh Show Shop in Canton, Connecticut. She had feature roles as "the other woman" in both Made in Heaven and John Loves Mary, ironically just after getting married herself. She then had a five-month run with a revival tour of The Barretts of Wimpole Street through the Mid-Atlantic states, Missouri, and Michigan. Her performance as Cousin Bella was well-received by more than one reviewer.

New York TV
Natalie Norwick's first experience in television came in May 1945, when she was one of eight cast members for a special one-time dual radio-TV broadcast of The Town Crier of Chungking. This program was the culmination of an effort by radio station WNEW to experiment with television, using the facilities of DuMont TV Station WABD.

During August and September 1950, Natalie performed in one episode each of two half-hour live anthology series on NBC TV, The Clock and Armstrong Circle Theatre. She followed these with appearances as herself on two television shows hosted by Robert Q. Lewis, The Robert Q. Lewis Show in late 1950 and The Show Goes On in early 1951. That same year, she also took part in her first film, Fourteen Hours, a 20th Century Fox movie shot on location in New York City by director Henry Hathaway. Like many of the bit players hired locally for this production, Natalie was uncredited. The following year, Natalie had two more acting performances on anthology series, Kraft Television Theatre and Studio One.

For the winter of 1952–53, Natalie joined the Bliss Reparatory Company in presenting alternating plays on a tour of the Mid-Atlantic states. She had the female lead in P. G. Wodehouse's 1929 play Candle Light and the feature role of Phebe in Shakespere's As You Like It. After weeks of constant performing in drafty theaters and auditoriums, she suffered a bout of laryngitis. This may have led to her decision to relocate to the West Coast and pursue television and film acting.

West Coast breakthrough
Natalie Norwick had worked on the West Coast once before, for a stage production of Detective Story starring Robert Preston. She relocated there permanently in early 1954, and by May had started work on I Led 3 Lives, the first of four TV series in which she appeared that year. Next was an anthology series, Schlitz Playhouse, followed by the show that really launched her career, Medic. The episode "With This Ring" had her guest star as an unwed mother-to-be, a controversial topic at the time. At an age (30) when the careers of many other actresses fall off a cliff, Natalie's was given a second life.

Besides the publicity the Medic show afforded her, it also marked the start of a working relationship with the star of the series, Richard Boone. He was her television mentor, and his production company later employed her on seven episodes of his second series, Have Gun - Will Travel. They also worked together on a production of Wuthering Heights, with Natalie playing Isabella to his Heathcliff.

Besides her many television appearances in the mid- and late 1950s, Natalie had small credited parts in two films, 23 Paces to Baker Street (1956) and Hidden Fear (1957), neither of which generated much following. Thereafter, she confined her acting to the small screen, performing in dozens of television shows up to the early 1960s. Though she played a few leading-lady roles, her most extensive use was in character parts, by turns comical, quirky, sly, shrill, or just plain mean as the script demanded.

Later career
Anthology series, which were better suited to those with extensive stage experience, were in decline in the later 1950s. By 1960, broadcast television was dominated by narrative series employing a permanent cast of regulars with a few new guest stars each episode. While she easily found work in the latter type of series, the frantic pace of her television career began to slow down, so that she once again took up the stage after a hiatus of many years. She played the emotionally jarring role of the Samurai's Wife for a stage adaption of Rashomon in a two-month Los Angeles run, followed by a one-time performance as Hippolyta in A Midsummer Night's Dream.

She averaged less than one television role per year from 1963 on, though her 1966 appearance in a minor part of a Star Trek episode, "The Conscience of the King" retains some prominence. 
 
From 1970 on, Natalie Norwick's career was marked by long gaps between performances. She undoubtedly had more stage work than can be documented today, as the slow decline of print media reduced coverage of regional theater. She performed on Broadway during 1979 for the short-lived Break A Leg, playing her own role and understudying the female lead, Julie Harris. Her television work ended in 1982 when she was 59, and thereafter she did only sporadic stage work.

Final performance
Broadway called again in 1997, when Norwick was cast as standby to Julie Harris for a revival of the award-winning The Gin Game. The two-person cast co-starred actor Charles Durning, with Tom Troupe as his standby. The revival ran for 19 previews and 145 performances from April 5 to August 31, 1997, at the Lyceum Theatre. The Broadway company, including Natalie, then did a seven-month tour from October 28, 1998. While playing Stamford, Connecticut, in late February 1999, Julie Harris suffered a fall. By the time the tour reached Ft. Lauderdale, Florida, Julie had to undergo emergency surgery for a fluid build-up from the fall. Natalie Norwick did the remaining shows at the Parker Playhouse in Ft. Lauderdale then the opening performances at the Kennedy Center in Washington, DC the following week. By the time the tour finished in Boston, Julie Harris had rejoined the cast.

Following The Gin Game, Natalie Norwick retired to Coconut Creek, Florida, where she spent the remaining years of her life. She died at age 84 on December 20, 2007.

Personal life
While appearing in summer-stock theatre, Natalie married New York TV director Bernard Robertson in Stamford, Connecticut, on June 4, 1949. She must have already legally assumed her stage name, for "Norwick" was her surname on the official record. She later divorced him in Santa Monica, California, during spring 1955.

Like many actors when between stage or television performances, Natalie Norwick had a part-time job, in her case as a hat-check girl at Lindy's Restaurant in Manhattan. She worked at this anonymous situation until columnist Walter Winchell outed her.

A newspaper ran a publicity portrait photo of Natalie Norwick in August 1959, describing her as "five-foot-two in her stocking feet", brown-eyed, and "plays the piano for fun". It also mentioned she liked to take walks, dance, and play chess.

Columnist Mike Connolly mentioned in February 1960 that Natalie Norwick and her boyfriend, actor Ross Martin, had parted ways due to incompatible work schedules. He was separated from his first wife at the time, and was a series regular on Mr. Lucky, while Natalie was starting rehearsals for a stage adaption of Rashomon.

Stage performances

Filmography

References

External links
 

20th-century American actresses
People from the Bronx
1923 births
2007 deaths
21st-century American women